"Fast Movin' Train" is a song written by Dave Loggins and recorded by American country music group Restless Heart. It was released in December 1989 as the first single and title track from the album Fast Movin' Train.  The song reached number 4 on the Billboard Hot Country Singles & Tracks chart.

Content
The song is about a guy who falls for a woman on a one-night stand. She wants nothing to do with him beyond their one night together.

Music video
The music video was directed by Jay Brown and premiered in late 1989. Billiards legend Rudolf Wanderone, who adopted the name "Minnesota Fats" after Jackie Gleason's character in the 1961 film The Hustler, has a cameo appearance in the video.

Chart performance

Year-end charts

References

1989 singles
Restless Heart songs
Songs written by Dave Loggins
Song recordings produced by Scott Hendricks
Songs about trains
RCA Records singles
1989 songs